Alejandro Escardó "Ale" Llamas (born 6 June 1998) is a Spanish footballer who plays as a left winger for Antequera CF, on loan from AD Alcorcón.

Club career
Born in Benalmádena, Málaga, Andalusia, Llamas joined Málaga CF's youth setup in 2007 at the age of nine, from Atlético Benamiel CF. On 11 August 2017, after finishing his formation, he was loaned to Segunda División B side Écija Balompié for the season.

Llamas made his senior debut on 26 August 2017, playing the last ten minutes and scoring the winner in a 2–1 home success over CD Badajoz. He returned to Málaga the following June after contributing with two goals in 24 appearances, but moved to Betis Deportivo Balompié in Tercera División on 31 August 2018.

On 16 August 2019, Llamas moved to El Palo FC, still in division four. On 2 July of the following year, he joined fellow league team CD El Ejido for the ensuing play-offs, and helped in their promotion by starting in both matches.

On 2 September 2020, Llamas signed for AD Alcorcón and was initially assigned to the B-team also in the fourth tier. He made his first team debut eleven days later, coming on as a late substitute for Samuel Sosa in a 0–0 away draw against CD Mirandés in the Segunda División championship.

On 1 February 2021, Llamas moved to third division side Cultural y Deportiva Leonesa on loan for the remainder of the season. On 22 July, he moved to Segunda División RFEF side Antequera CF, also in a temporary deal.

References

External links

1998 births
Living people
Sportspeople from the Province of Málaga
Spanish footballers
Footballers from Andalusia
Association football wingers
Segunda División players
Segunda División B players
Tercera División players
Atlético Malagueño players
Écija Balompié players
Betis Deportivo Balompié footballers
CD El Palo players
AD Alcorcón B players
AD Alcorcón footballers
Cultural Leonesa footballers
Antequera CF footballers